Connecticut National Bank v. Germain, 503 U.S. 249 (1992), was a case in which the Supreme Court of the United States held that an interlocutory order of a district court, sitting as an appellate court in a bankruptcy case, is in turn reviewable by the court of appeals when authorized under 28 U.S.C. § 1292. Although the Justices were unanimous in deciding the specific statutory interpretation issue concerning bankruptcy appeals that the case presented, they disagreed on the extent to which it was appropriate to refer to the legislative history of the statute in resolving the case.

Background 
In the United States, bankruptcy cases and many lawsuits involving a bankrupt party are heard by the United States Bankruptcy Court for the appropriate judicial district. Appeals from Bankruptcy Court decisions are ordinarily taken to the United States District Court for that district. Under Section 158(d) of title 28 of the United States Code, appeals from final judgments of the district courts in bankruptcy cases may be taken to the Court of Appeals for the circuit. However, Section 158(d) contained no provision for appeals from interlocutory, or non-final, District Court decisions in such cases.

A separate provision of title 28, 28 U.S.C. § 1292, addresses appeals from the District Court to the Court of Appeals where a District Court's decision is interlocutory, that is, is not the final decision in the case. (Section 1292 deals with all federal civil cases, as opposed to section 158 which deals specifically with bankruptcy cases.) Ordinarily, in the federal system, only final judgments may be appealed from the District Court to the Court of Appeals, under 28 U.S.C. § 1291. Section 1292 creates limited exceptions to this rule, including appeals from orders granting or denying injunctions, or cases in which the District Court and the Court of Appeals grant special permission to appeal.

In a bankruptcy case pending in Connecticut, a dispute arose as to whether the parties were entitled to a jury trial. The Bankruptcy Court ruled in favor of a jury trial, and on appeal, the District Court affirmed. The defendant, Connecticut National Bank, then sought to appeal this interlocutory ruling to the United States Court of Appeals for the Second Circuit, but that court held it had no jurisdiction and dismissed the appeal.

The Supreme Court granted certiorari to resolve a dispute as to whether a District Court's interlocutory order on a bankruptcy appeal was appealable to the Court of Appeals in the circumstances authorized under section 1292. The case was argued by Janet C. Hall, now a federal judge in Connecticut, for the petitioner, and by bankruptcy trustee Thomas M. Germain for himself as respondent.

Opinion of the Court 
Justice Clarence Thomas wrote the Court's opinion, which was joined by Chief Justice William Rehnquist and Justices Antonin Scalia, Anthony Kennedy, and David Souter. In his opinion, Justice Thomas reviewed the language of the different statutory provisions, concluding that while there was some overlap between the provisions of Section 158 and Sections 1291 and 1292, each section also covers some cases that the other would not. Thomas observed that "[r]edundancies across statutes are not unusual events in drafting, and so long as there is no "positive repugnancy" between two laws ... a court must give effect to both."

Thomas asserted that the meaning of the statutes was clear from their wording. Therefore, he asserted, there was no need for the Court to examine the legislative history of Section 158. The opinion concluded that "[t]here is no reason to infer from either § 1292 or § 158(d) that Congress meant to limit appellate review of interlocutory orders in bankruptcy proceedings. So long as a party to a proceeding or case in bankruptcy meets the conditions imposed by § 1292, a court of appeals may rely on that statute as a basis for jurisdiction."

Opinions concurring in the judgment 
Two Justices, John Paul Stevens and Sandra Day O'Connor authored brief opinions "concurring in the judgment," meaning that they agreed with the outcome of the case but not with the reasoning of the majority. Justices Byron R. White and Harry Blackmun joined O'Connor's concurrence.

Justice Stevens began his opinion by stating that "[w]henever there is some uncertainty about the meaning of a statute, it is prudent to examine its legislative history." Here, the legislative history of Section 158(d) contained no indication that this statute was intended to supersede Sections 1291 or 1292. Stevens stated that he agreed with the Court's decision for this reason, in addition to the majority's textual analysis.

Justice O'Connor's one-paragraph opinion observed that the Court's decision did create some redundancy between the different provisions of title 28. However, she found it "far more likely that Congress inadvertently created a redundancy than that Congress intended to withdraw appellate jurisdiction over interlocutory bankruptcy appeals by the roundabout method of reconferring jurisdiction over appeals from final bankruptcy orders," and joined in voting to reverse the Second Circuit's judgment only for this reason.

References

External links
 

1992 in United States case law
United States bankruptcy case law
United States statutory interpretation case law
United States Supreme Court cases
United States Supreme Court cases of the Rehnquist Court